"Your Latest Trick" is a song by Dire Straits, the fourth track on their fifth studio album, Brothers in Arms (1985). It was released as the album's fifth and final single in April 1986. It later appeared on the live album On the Night; the same live version is on Sultans of Swing: The Very Best of Dire Straits. The full-length studio album version was included on the compilation The Best of Dire Straits & Mark Knopfler: Private Investigations.

Music
Randy Brecker played the trumpet intro on the CD version, but it is missing on the vinyl version. After that, there is a saxophone intro, played by Michael Brecker, who also plays the saxophone solo. Chris White played the saxophone part on the live version on the Brothers in Arms and On Every Street world tours.

The saxophone introduction was used in the theme music for the TVB series File of Justice.

According to Classic Rock critic Paul Rees, the song was originally done at a faster, jazzier tempo, but Dire Straits' manager Ed Bicknell suggested slowing it down to the "stately bossa nova" that was released.

Single release
"Your Latest Trick" was released as a 12" maxi single on 28 April 1986 as the fifth and final single from the "Brothers in Arms" album in the UK, as well as in other selected territories including Brazil. The single did not have a US release. It peaked at #26 on the UK charts.

The other songs featured on the single were "Irish Boy" and "The Road," both credited as solo efforts by Mark Knopfler.

Reception
Rees rated "Your Latest Trick" to be Dire Straits' 10th greatest song, saying that it "stirs up the humid, smoky atmosphere of a Latino cantina at midnight."  Cash Box described the song as "bittersweet" and said that it has hints of Tina Turner's song "Private Dancer," which was written by Knopfler and originally intended for Dire Straits' previous album Love over Gold.

Track listings
 7" 
 "Your Latest Trick"
 "Irish Boy" by Mark Knopfler
 "The Road" by Mark Knopfler

 12" maxi
 "Your Latest Trick" – 6:28
 "Irish Boy" by Mark Knopfler – 4:36
 "The Long Road" by Mark Knopfler – 7:13

Charts

1 EP "Your Latest Trick" / "Encores"

References

1986 singles
1993 singles
1985 songs
Dire Straits songs
SNEP Top Singles number-one singles
Songs written by Mark Knopfler
Song recordings produced by Mark Knopfler
Vertigo Records singles